Shimelis Bekele Godo (born 2 January 1990) is an Ethiopian professional footballer who plays as an attacking midfielder for Egyptian Premier League club El Gouna FC and captains the Ethiopia national team. He represented Ethiopia in the 2013 and 2021 Africa Cup of Nations.

Career statistics
Scores and results list Ethiopia's goal tally first, score column indicates score after each Bekele goal.

References

External links
 
 

1990 births
Living people
People from Awasa
Sportspeople from Southern Nations, Nationalities, and Peoples' Region
Ethiopian footballers
Ethiopia international footballers
Association football midfielders
2013 Africa Cup of Nations players
2021 Africa Cup of Nations players
Libyan Premier League players
Egyptian Premier League players
Hawassa City S.C. players
Saint George S.C. players
Al-Ittihad Club (Tripoli) players
Al-Merrikh SC players
Petrojet SC players
Misr Lel Makkasa SC players
El Gouna FC players
Ethiopian expatriate footballers
Ethiopian expatriate sportspeople in Libya
Expatriate footballers in Libya
Ethiopian expatriate sportspeople in Sudan
Expatriate footballers in Sudan
Ethiopian expatriate sportspeople in Egypt
Expatriate footballers in Egypt